Ge Wang (born November 2, 1977) is a Chinese American professor, musician, computer scientist, designer, and author, known for inventing the ChucK audio programming language 
and for being the co-founder, chief technology officer (CTO), and chief creative officer (CCO) of Smule, a company making iPhone and iPad music apps. He also helped create the Princeton Laptop Orchestra and later founded its Stanford counterpart Stanford Laptop Orchestra, as well as the Stanford Mobile Phone Orchestra. 
Wang is the designer of the Ocarina 
and Magic Piano iPhone apps.  Wang is currently an associate professor at Stanford University’s Center for Computer Research in Music and Acoustics (CCRMA).  Wang is the author of Artful Design: Technology in Search of the Sublime (A MusiComic Manifesto), a book on design and technology, art and life, created entirely in the format of a photo comic book, published by Stanford University Press in 2018.

References

External links 
 Official Website
 ChucK Music Programming Language
 Stanford Laptop Orchestra
 TED talk: "The DIY Orchestra of the Future"
 Book: Artful Design: Technology in Search of the Sublime (A MusiComic Manifesto)

Computer scientists
American musicians of Chinese descent
Living people
American chief technology officers
1977 births
Princeton University School of Engineering and Applied Science alumni
Duke University alumni